The 2000 Oregon Ducks football team represented the University of Oregon during the 2000 NCAA Division I-A football season. The Ducks were led by sixth year head coach Mike Bellotti and participated as members of the Pacific-10 Conference. They played their home games at Autzen Stadium in Eugene, Oregon. Their roster on offense included quarterbacks Joey Harrington and A. J. Feeley, runningbacks Maurice Morris, Allan Amundson, Ryan Shaw, and Josh Line, receivers Marshaun Tucker, Sonny Cook, Cy Aleman, and tight ends Justin Peelle and Lacorey Collins.

Schedule

Roster

Game summaries

Washington

Arizona State

Oregon played at Arizona State in the 2000 college football season. Oregon trailed 49-35 in the final four minutes. The Ducks scored a touchdown to make it a one possession game, but then were unable to score after getting the ball back late in the game. With possession and time on its side, Arizona State needed just a single first down to run out the clock and win the game. But as Arizona State freshman running back Mike Williams was crossing the first down marker, he fumbled the ball and Oregon was able to recover it at the 17-yard line, giving the Ducks one last chance. Joey Harrington then hit Justin Peelle with a touchdown pass to tie the game with 27 seconds left. After neither team was able to score in the first overtime period, Oregon scored on a one-yard run by Allan Amundson and the extra point by Josh Frankel put them up by seven points in the second overtime. Freshman Jeff Krohn then threw his fifth touchdown pass on Arizona State's next possession, finding Richard Williams from 21 yards out and bringing the Sun Devils within a PAT of forcing a 3rd overtime. After an Oregon touchdown, and instead of kicking the extra point after scoring, Arizona State faked the kick and had quarterback Jeff Krohn roll out to his right, throwing a pass toward tight end Todd Heap in the back of the end zone. The pass tipped off Heap's extended hand and fell incomplete, giving Oregon a 56-55 double overtime victory.

Washington State

Source: USA Today
    
    
    
    
    
    
    
    
    

Defensive tackle Jed Boice blocked Anousith Wilaikul's 39-yard field goal attempt in overtime to win the game.

Holiday Bowl

Source: Sports Illustrated

Rankings

References

Oregon
Oregon Ducks football seasons
Pac-12 Conference football champion seasons
Holiday Bowl champion seasons
Oregon Ducks football